United State may refer to:

 U.S. states, fifty of which make up (the majority of) the United States of America
 Union of Russia and Belarus, sometimes called the United State (Союзное государство Soyuznoye gosudarstvo)
 Unitary state
 United State of Electronica, the Seattle dance/rock band
 U.S.A. (United State of Atlanta), the album by rap duo Ying Yang Twins
 "United State", the third track on the album Voices by Hall & Oates
 "United State", the 2011 album by rock band Brand New Sin

See also
 Union State, a supranational union of Russia and Belarus
 United States, a sovereign state of North America
 Unity State, a former state of South Sudan
 United States (disambiguation)